Pterodontia westwoodi is a species of small-headed flies (insects in the family Acroceridae).

References

Acroceridae
Articles created by Qbugbot
Insects described in 1948
Taxa named by Curtis Williams Sabrosky